Phil Gaudion is an Australian professional drummer who played for the Paul Colman Trio. He is from Melbourne, Australia. He started drumming at the age of twelve.

External links
 Phil Gaudion's website 

Living people
Year of birth missing (living people)
People from Melbourne
Australian drummers
Male drummers
Paul Colman Trio members
Australian male musicians